The Czech Republic competed at the 2019 Winter Deaflympics held between 12 and 21 December 2019 in Province of Sondrio in Northern Italy. Most medals were won in alpine skiing and the country finished in 4th place with a total of two gold medals, four silver medals and one bronze medal.

Medalists

Alpine skiing 

Jiří Hartig won the bronze medal in the men's giant slalom event.

Tereza Kmochová won the gold medal in the women's giant slalom event and the silver medals in the four other women's alpine skiing events: the women's downhill event, the women's slalom event, the women's alpine combined event and the women's Super-G event.

Snowboarding 

Tomáš Pazdera won the gold medal in the men's snowboard cross event.

References 

Winter Deaflympics
Nations at the 2019 Winter Deaflympics